Edward Hartigan (1877 – 1962) was a professional South African cricketer. He played in nine first-class matches for Border from 1902/1903 to 1926/1927.

See also
 List of Border representative cricketers

References

External links
 

1877 births
1962 deaths
South African cricketers
Border cricketers
Cricketers from East London, Eastern Cape